Jiwati is a town and a tehsil in Rajura subdivision of Chandrapur district in Nagpur revenue Division in the state of Maharashtra, India. 17 September is celebrated as Muktisangram Diwas in Jiwati as well as Korpana and Rajura talukas. Manikgad fort is a tourist spot in Jiwati taluka which is 12 km away from taluka headquarters. According to 2011 census the population of Jiwati town is 3764 of which 1888 are male and 1876 are female.

References

Cities and towns in Chandrapur district
Talukas in Maharashtra